Voin is a rural locality (a selo) in Khomustakhsky 2-y Rural Okrug of Namsky District in the Sakha Republic, Russia, located  from Namtsy, the administrative center of the district and  from Khatas, the administrative center of the rural okrug. Its population as of the 2002 Census was 57.

References

Notes

Sources
Official website of the Sakha Republic. Registry of the Administrative-Territorial Divisions of the Sakha Republic. Namsky District. 

Rural localities in Namsky District
Populated places on the Lena River